Arthur J. Ruland (October 27, 1886 – May 9, 1973) was an American lawyer and politician from New York.

Life 
Ruland was born on October 27, 1886, in Nineveh, New York, the son of George M. and Delphine A. Ruland. His father was a farmer. He graduated from Binghamton High School in 1904.

Ruland attended the Syracuse University College of Liberal Arts from 1904 to 1905 and the Syracuse University College of Law from 1905 to 1908. He graduated from the latter college with an LL.B. in 1908. He was admitted to the bar in 1908 and began practicing law in Binghamton. In the 1909–1910 school year he taught advanced English and oratory in the Binghamton High School. He was connected with the Empire Lyceum Bureau of Syracuse as a lecturer for two years, and would speak in various states until he began focusing more of his time on his growing legal practice. During World War I, he was an active four minute man. He was also special counsel for the State Department of Excise and local attorney for the American Railway Express Company and the Binghamton Real Estate Board.

Ruland was the Broome County attorney for the State Agricultural Department. In 1911, he was elected to the New York State Assembly as a Democrat, representing Broome County. He served in the Assembly in 1912. He lost the 1912 re-election to Republican Mortimer B. Edwards, and in 1913 he lost the election to the Assembly to Republican Simon P. Quick. In the 1942 United States House of Representatives election, he was the Democratic candidate in New York's 34th congressional district. He lost the election to Edwin Arthur Hall.

Ruland was a prominent member of the Improved Order of Red Men in New York, having been elected great junior sagamore for New York State in 1918, great senior sagamore in 1919, great sachem in 1920, great prophet in 1921, and great representative to the Great Council of the United States. He was a 32nd degree Freemason, president of the University Club from 1918 to 1919, and a member of Delta Sigma Rho and Phi Delta Phi. He was a member of the Methodist Episcopal Church.

Ruland died in the Asa Park Manor nursing home in Montrose, Pennsylvania on May 9, 1973. He was buried in Floral Park Cemetery.

References

External links 

 The Political Graveyard

1886 births
1973 deaths
Syracuse University College of Law alumni
20th-century American lawyers
Lawyers from Binghamton, New York
Politicians from Binghamton, New York
20th-century American politicians
Democratic Party members of the New York State Assembly
Improved Order of Red Men
American Freemasons
Members of the Methodist Episcopal Church
Burials in New York (state)